The Yesu Matha Niragaranam (யேசு மத நிராகரணம், The Refuting the Religion of Jesus) is a Tamil tract against Christianity, written by Siva Prakasar. The book includes brief examples and analogies. It is a classic instance of a clash between a Semitic religion and an oriental tradition. The concept of karma and sin have crossed in the debate.

Siva Prakasar
Siva Prakasar is a Tamil philosopher, sage and poet who lived at the end of 17th century. He is also called ‘Siva anuputhi selvar, ‘Karpanai Kalangiyam’, or ‘Thurai mangalam Sivaprakasar’ for the benefit of human beings. Sivaprakasa Swamigal, a Shaiva Siddhanta. contributed more than thirty four books to Tamil literature.

History
Historian Roberto de Nobili met Prakasar and debated him about Hinduism and Christianity. After the debate Prakasar compiled this book. No copies of this book have been found. Few writers say that Sivaprakasar debated with Rev. Fr. Constanzo Beschi (alias Veera ma munivar) rather than de Nobili.

S.V.S. Rathinam a bench magistrate from Prakasar's brother Velaiyar's lineage mentioned this book in his autobiography Naan Ungal Thoni. He wrote that his grandfather Susai alias Swaminatha Desikar son of Sundaresanar had a palm leaflet copy.

References

Tamil-language literature
Shaivism
Hindu texts
Hymns
Tamil philosophy
17th-century Indian books